Women University Mardan is a public university situated in Mardan, Khyber Pakhtunkhwa, Pakistan. The university is run by the Government of Khyber Pakhtunkhwa and was founded in 2016. This university has played major role to increase the rate of higher education among women in the city of Mardan and adjoining areas.

Overview and history 
Women University Mardan was established as a result of popular demand from the people of the Mardan in 2012. Dr Ghazala Yasmeen was appointed as first Vice Chancellor of the university. The current Women University Mardan was basically the building of Abdul Wali Khan University Mardan which has been handed over to the administration along with requisite equipment and fixture. While a special ceremony was arranged in this regard which was attended by the AWKUM then Vice-Chancellor Prop.Dr. Ihsan Ali and Women University Vice-Chancellor Prof Dr Ghazala Yasmin, said a press release.

Prop.Dr. Ihsan Ali (SI) said a dream had come true as Mardan has got a women's university. He said the development of Pakhtuns hinges on acquisition of education alone. The VC said Khyber Pakhtunkhwa was lucky to have several universities. He said the graduates from these universities were bringing laurels for the country. Dr Ihasan Ali promised to extend all facilities to the women university. He said this university was the Independence Day celebrations gift to the people of Mardan.

Departments
Currently the university is  operating following  Departments.

 Department of Economics 
 Department of English
 Department of Islamiyat
 Department of Management Science
 Department of Microbiology
 Department of Psychology
 Department of Human Nutrition and Dietatics
 Department of Zoology
 Department of Political Science
 Department of Physics
 Department of Urdu
 Department of Biotechnology

See also
Abdul Wali Khan University Mardan
Women University Swabi
Shaheed Benazir Bhutto Women University, Peshawar

References

External links 

Women's universities and colleges in Pakistan
Educational institutions established in 2016
2016 establishments in Pakistan
Public universities and colleges in Khyber Pakhtunkhwa
Mardan District